Count Hans Christoff von Königsmarck, of Tjust (4 March 1600 – 8 March 1663) was a German soldier who commanded Sweden's legendary flying column, a force which played a key role in the Swedish military strategy in the Thirty Years' War.

Ealy life 
He was born in Kötzlin, Altmark as the son of Konrad von Königsmarck (1570-1620) and his wife, Beata Beatrix Elisabeth von Blumenthal (1580-1621).

Biography 
After serving as a page on the court of Prince Frederick Ulrich of Wolfenbüttel, he entered Imperial military service in 1620. After the dissolution of Albrecht von Wallenstein's troops and Gustavus Adolphus' intervention, Königsmarck offered his services to the Swedish King. By 1635 he commanded his own regiment. He was appointed Major General in 1640, Governor-General of Bremen-Verden in 1645, Privy Councilor in 1651 and Field Marshal in 1655. He is best known for the Siege of Prague between 25 June and 1 November 1648, where he managed to capture and loot the left-bank of Prague but failed to take the Old Town until fighting ended with news of the Peace of Westphalia.

During the Second Northern War, Königsmarck was captured on a sea passage to the Polish front by Danzigian ships and held prisoner at Weichselmünde until the Treaty of Oliva 1660.

In 1655 Königsmarck erected a castle in Lieth and named it after his wife Agathe von Leesten. The name of the castle, Agathenburg, also became the toponym of the village Lieth. Their children were:
 Otto Wilhelm von Königsmarck
 Conrad or Kurt Christoph von Königsmarck, whose children were:
 Karl Johann von Königsmarck
 Maria Aurora von Königsmarck.
 Amalia Wilhelmina von Königsmarck
 Philip Christoph von Königsmarck
 Beata Elisabet von Königsmarck
He died, aged 63, in Stockholm.

References
 :de:s:ADB:Königsmarck, Hans Christoph Graf von

Notes

External links
WorldCat page

1605 births
1663 deaths
People from Kyritz
Field marshals of Sweden
Governors-General of Sweden
Members of the Privy Council of Sweden
Swedish people of the Thirty Years' War
German emigrants to Sweden
Swedish people of German descent
Swedish nobility
People from the Margraviate of Brandenburg
17th-century Swedish military personnel
17th-century Swedish politicians
Military personnel of the Thirty Years' War